Lake Township, Ohio, may refer to:
Lake Township, Ashland County, Ohio
Lake Township, Logan County, Ohio
Lake Township, Stark County, Ohio
Lake Township, Wood County, Ohio

Ohio township disambiguation pages